Maurice Sterne (1877 or 1878 – July 23, 1957), was an American sculptor and painter remembered today for his association with philanthropist Mabel Dodge Luhan, to whom he was married from 1916 to 1923.

Biography
Sterne was born in Liepāja, Latvia, the youngest of five children to an Orthodox Jewish family living in the port city of Libau (now Liepāja), Latvia, when it was part of the Russian Empire. After Sterne's father died, his mother moved the rest of the family to Moscow. In 1889 Sterne, his mother and sister were forced to leave Moscow, and sailed to New York City.

He began his career as a draftsman and painter, and critics noted the similarity of his work, in its volume and weight, to sculpture. In the late 1890s, Sterne studied under Alfred Maurer and Thomas Eakins at the National Academy of Design, and then traveled widely in Europe and the Far East. A trip to Greece in 1908 introduced him to archaic Greek statues, inspiring him to experiment with the form himself in stone.

From 1911 to 1914 he and his friend Karli Sohn-Rethel, a German painter, traveled together to India, the Far East and settled in Bali to paint and sketch, which further informed his later work.

Sterne came to New Mexico in 1916 at the suggestion of his friend, Paul Burlin, and settled in Taos until 1918.

His reputation was established by a show at the Scott and Fowles Gallery in 1926 and furthered by a retrospective at the Museum of Modern Art in 1933.  In the mid-1930s, Sterne lived in San Francisco and taught at the California School of Fine Arts. He returned to the East Coast in 1945 and established a studio in Mount Kisco, New York. He was named to the American Academy of Arts and Letters in 1938. From 1945 to 1950, he served on the U.S. Commission of Fine Arts.

In addition to his murals in the library of the Department of Justice in Washington, D.C., Sterne's works are in the collections of the Metropolitan Museum of Art, the Art Institute of Chicago, the Corcoran Gallery of Art, and the Phillips Collection.  Sterne was one of a dozen sculptors invited to compete in the Pioneer Woman statue competition in 1927, which he failed to win.

Sterne died in 1957 in Mount Kisco, New York.

Artwork

Notes

References

External links

Sitting Figure at the National Gallery of Art
Biography Maurice Sterne, American Art Timeline, The Phillips Collection
Maurice Sterne Papers. Yale Collection of American Literature, Beinecke Rare Book and Manuscript Library.

1870s births
1957 deaths
19th-century American painters
19th-century American male artists
American male painters
20th-century American painters
20th-century American sculptors
19th-century American sculptors
American male sculptors
Jewish American artists
Emigrants from the Russian Empire to the United States
Burials at Kensico Cemetery
20th-century American male artists